The 1965 Japan Series was the Nippon Professional Baseball (NPB) championship series for the 1965 season. It was the 16th Japan Series and featured the Pacific League champions, the Nankai Hawks, against the Central League champions, the Yomiuri Giants.

Summary

Matchups

Game 1
Saturday, October 30, 1965 – 1:00 pm at Osaka Stadium in Osaka, Osaka Prefecture

See also
1965 World Series

References

Japan Series
Japan Series
Japan Series
Japan Series
Japan Series